Morchella varisiensis is a later synonym of Morchella semilibera. The fungus, which belongs to the family Morchellaceae, was described from Italy as a new species in 2010, but subsequent molecular testing of the holotype by Richard and colleagues revealed it to be conspecific to the half-free morel (M. semilibera).

References

External links

Morchellaceae
Edible fungi
Fungi described in 2010
Fungi of Europe